The French ironclad Trident was the second and last ship of the s that were built for the French Navy in the 1870s. The ship was the flagship of the deputy commander of the Mediterranean Squadron for most of her career. She took part in the French occupation of Tunisia, notably shelling and landing troops in Sfax in 1881. Trident was reclassified as a training ship in 1894 and condemned in 1900, before she was finally sold for scrap in 1909.

Design and description
The Colbert-class ships were designed by Constructor Sabattier as improved versions of the ironclad . As a central battery ironclad, Trident had her armament concentrated amidships. Like most ironclads of her era she was equipped with a plough-shaped ram. Her crew numbered 774 officers and men. The metacentric height of the ship was low, a little above .

Propulsion
Trident had a single Wolf three-cylinder horizontal return connecting-rod compound steam engine that drove one propeller. On sea trials, the engine produced  and Trident reached .

Armament
Trident had two  guns mounted in barbettes on the upper deck, one gun at the forward corners of the battery, with six additional guns on the battery deck below the barbettes. The side of the upper deck were cut away to improve the ability of the barbette guns to bear fore and aft. One  was mounted in the forecastle as a chase gun. The ship's secondary armament consisted of six  guns, four forward of the battery and two aft. These latter two guns were replaced in 1878 by another 240-millimeter gun as a stern chaser. The ship also mounted four above-water  torpedo tubes.

All of the ship's guns could fire both solid shot and explosive shells. The 274-millimeter Modèle 1870 gun was credited with the ability to penetrate a maximum  of wrought iron armor while the 240-millmeter Modèle 1870 gun could  penetrate  of wrought iron armor.

At some point the ship received fourteen to eighteen  Hotchkiss 5-barrel revolving guns. They had a rate of fire of about 30 rounds per minute.

Armor

Service
Trident, named after the weapon that symbolized mastery of the seas, was laid down in April 1870 in Toulon and launched on 9 November 1876. While the exact reason for such prolonged construction time is not known, it is believed that reduction of the French Navy's budget after the Franco-Prussian War of 1870–71 and out-of-date work practices in French dockyards were likely causes. The ship was completed on 1 November 1878 and became the flagship of the second-in-command of the Mediterranean Squadron the following month. Trident, together with her sister ship , bombarded the Tunisian port of Sfax on 15–16 July 1881 as the French occupied Tunisia. She was disarmed and placed in reserve in 1886–89, but was recommissioned on 17 February 1889 and resumed her role as flagship until she was again placed in reserve in 1894. The ship served as a gunnery training ship until she was condemned on 5 March 1900. Trident was renamed Var in 1904 and was sold for scrap five years later.

Footnotes

References

External links 

1876 ships
Colbert-class ironclads
Ships built in France